Harry W. Jenkins is a former major general in the United States Marine Corps.

Career
Jenkins graduated from San Jose State College with a B.A. degree in June 1960, and was commissioned a second lieutenant in the Marine Corps. He also holds an M.S. degree from the University of Wisconsin (1972).
He completed The Basic School the following year. He was then assigned to the 5th Marine Regiment and then the 9th Marine Regiment in Okinawa, Japan.

From 1962 to 1964, Jenkins was executive officer of the San Francisco Naval Shipyard. The following year, he became a senior instructor at the Mountain Warfare Training Center.

After studying amphibious warfare at the Officer Candidates School, Jenkins was deployed to serve in the Vietnam War with the 26th Marine Regiment. In 1969, he was assigned to the 1st Marine Division as Civil Affairs Officer.

After returning to the United States, Jenkins was named the Marine Officer instructor of the Naval Reserve Officers Training Corps at the University of Wisconsin–Madison. From there he was stationed at Headquarters Marine Corps, where he eventually served in the Office of the Commandant of the Marine Corps.

In 1976, Jenkins was deployed to serve with the 9th Marine Regiment. The following year, he was assigned to the Office of the Assistant Secretary of Defense for Public Affairs and served in the National Military Command Center. After graduating from the Naval War College, Jenkins returned to Headquarters Marine Corps.

Jenkins was assigned to the 2nd Marine Division in 1984. In 1986, he became chief of staff of the division. The following year, he was named legislative assistant to the commandant of the Marine Corps. In 1988, he was given the additional duties of director of public affairs.

In 1989, he was assigned to Naval Amphibious Base Little Creek. After serving in the Gulf War, Jenkins was named assistant chief of staff of command, control, communications and computers of the Marine Corps in 1991. The following year, he served as director, expeditionary warfare in the staff of the Chief of Naval Operations. Since retiring from the Marine Corps, he has served as chairman of the executive committee of the Marine Corps Association.

Awards and decorations

Awards he received during his career include the Navy Distinguished Service Medal, the Legion of Merit, the Bronze Star Medal with Combat Valor device and three award stars, the Defense Meritorious Service Medal, the Navy Commendation Medal with Combat Valor device, the Combat Action Ribbon, the Presidential Unit Citation with two service stars, the Navy Unit Commendation, the National Defense Service Medal with service star, the Vietnam Service Medal with silver service star, the Southwest Asia Service Medal with two service stars, the Navy Sea Service Deployment Ribbon with service star, the Arctic Service Ribbon, the Vietnamese Gallantry Cross, the Vietnam Campaign Medal and the Kuwait Liberation Medal.

Education
B.A. – San Jose State University
M.S. – University of Wisconsin-Madison

References

United States Marine Corps generals
Recipients of the Navy Distinguished Service Medal
Recipients of the Legion of Merit
Recipients of the Gallantry Cross (Vietnam)
United States Marine Corps personnel of the Vietnam War
United States Marine Corps personnel of the Gulf War
San Jose State University alumni
University of Wisconsin–Madison alumni
Naval War College alumni
Living people
Year of birth missing (living people)